He Mingying (born 14 April 1886) commonly known as He Ying  was a Chinese revolutionary. She was born in Sangzhi, Hunan province. Her original name was He Mingying and He Xianggu was her pet name.

Early life 
He Ying was born in the Sangzhi, Hunan province of China. She was the elder sister of He Long, a famous Marshal of the People's Republic of China. Her other siblings included He Wumei and He Mangu. They devoted themselves to the Chinese revolutionary cause that cost them their lives.

Career 

She married her cousin Gu Jitin in 1906. He Ying helped her husband with local military work. They lived in the Yun Jing Stronghold (a mountain fastness), and dealt with criminal activities and evil forces. He Ying gained the respect of her soldiers for her honesty and forthrightness.

In 1916, He Ying helped her younger brother He Long to kill local gentry–Zhu Haishan–and drive off the local tyrants such as Chen Mugong. Then she ran against Zhuo Xiaochu (leader of Cili Party) for the magistrate of Sangzhi.

In 1922, her husband was killed by a local warlord, Chen Quzheng. She picked up her husband's gun and led her followers into battle against warlords, tyrants, and bureaucrats.

In summer 1926, her brother He Long was commanding the 1st Division, 9th Corps of the National Revolutionary Army to start the Northern Expedition from Tongren (Guizhou province). He Ying and Sangzhi militia led by Wen Nanfu, Li Yunqing and Liu Yujei, attacked Sangzhi city and got rid of many officers. He Ying was welcomed by the masses and those of all walks of life to Sangzhi city. Following its stationing in the city, He Ying's troops adhered to strict disciplines.

In 1927, He Ying went to Wuhan with He Long and He Mangu. Affected by the Revolution, He Long battled and He Ying followed him. When they got home, He Ying devoted herself to the army expansion. Hundreds of soldiers enlisted within a month.

He Ying was skilled in martial arts. Once she came to a bandit den and personally captured their leader. She enlisted those bandits.

In spring 1928, He Long and military leader Zhou Yiqun were assigned to set up a revolutionary base in Western Hunan-Hubei Area. He Ying turned her troops over to her brother and Zhou Yiqun and threw herself into the work of Sangzhi Uprising. She had made a great contribution to revolutionary base setting. Although she did not join the Communist Party He Ying led its guerrilla forces. She was wounded in many battles and saved many people.

In October 1929, after the Red Army suffered a setback in Zhuang Erping War, He Ying led her troops to deal with the aftermath.

In spring 1930, when He Long took away the Red Army's main forces to the East of Hong lake, He Ying and her guerrilla forces stayed to coordinate with the Red Army's main forces.

During the War against “Encirclement and Suppression” in 1932, He Ying and her soldiers were hemmed in on all sides by the Kuomintang, but she refused to give up. She struggled and finally survived.

On the early morning of May 5, 1933, informed by a traitor, the enemy beset the guerrilla’s station, but she was wounded and died.

In September 2009, He Ying was honored as one of 100 people “Who Have Made Outstanding Contributions towards the Founding of P.R.C.”

See also 
He Long

References 

1886 births
1933 deaths
People from Zhangjiajie